The Texas Rambler is a 1935 American Western film directed by Robert F. Hill and written by Oliver Drake. The film stars Bill Cody, Marie Burton, Earle Hodgins, Stuart James, Mildred Rogers and Budd Buster. The film was released on May 15, 1935, by Spectrum Pictures.

Plot

Cast           
Bill Cody as Tom 'The Rambler' Manning
Marie Burton as Billie Conroy
Earle Hodgins as Flash Carson
Stuart James as Larry Morrison
Mildred Rogers as Rosa
Budd Buster as Seth Higgins
Roger Williams as Butch
Ace Cain as Pete
Buck Morgan as Mike
Allen Greer as Sheriff

References

External links
 

1935 films
1930s English-language films
American Western (genre) films
1935 Western (genre) films
Films directed by Robert F. Hill
American black-and-white films
1930s American films